List of finds in the substructures or interiors of Egyptian pyramids that have been explored and still contained notable findings in modern times. An absence of documented finds does not imply nothing was ever found.

Pyramids not listed have either not been located or explored (e.g.: due to flooding or collapse), have no substructure, were fully looted, or contained nothing of note.


Gallery

See also 

 Ancient Egyptian funerary practices
 Ancient Egyptian funerary texts
 List of pharaohs
 Pyramid Texts
 Sarcophagus

References

Bibliography

Further reading 

 

 
Pyramids, Egyptian
Pyramids
Pyramids in Egypt
Egyptology